Wladyslaw "Wlady" Pleszczynski is an American conservative editor and writer. He is editorial director and web editor of The American Spectator. His tenure at Spectator dates back to the early 1980s.

He is also a distinguished visiting fellow at the Hoover Institution, Pleszczynski edited Our Brave New World: Essays on the Impact of September 11 for Hoover Institution Press in 2002. He has written for the Wall Street Journal, Commentary, Slate, and other publications.

External links
 The American Spectator
 
 Biodata (Archive)

American editors
American male journalists
American magazine editors
American people of Polish descent
American political writers
The American Spectator people
Indiana University Bloomington alumni
Place of birth missing (living people)
Year of birth missing (living people)
Living people